The R419 road is a regional road in Ireland, linking Portlaoise, County Laois to Portarlington to Rathangan, County Kildare.

See also
Roads in Ireland
National primary road
National secondary road

References
Roads Act 1993 (Classification of Regional Roads) Order 2006 – Department of Transport

Regional roads in the Republic of Ireland
Roads in County Kildare
Roads in County Laois
Roads in County Offaly